Coleophora karsholti is a moth of the family Coleophoridae. It is found in Libya.

References

External links 

karsholti
Lepidoptera of North Africa
Endemic fauna of Libya
Moths described in 1987
Moths of Africa